Cluedo – en mordgåta [sv] is a Swedish gameshow which lasted for two seasons in 1996. It is an adaption of the British gameshow Cluedo adapted from the board game of the same name. It aired on TV4 during the spring and autumn of 1996. The two seasons had six episodes each. The presenter was Martin Timell, who turned to the show after "Vad är det du säger?" and "Trodde du ja!" after he left SVT forTV4. Each episode was aired in two parts on the same night, from 8-8:30pm and 8:35-8:50pm with a five minute program in-between. There was sometimes a five minute program called Inför Cluedo (Before Cluedo).

Production 
The murders occurred at the Döinge hus (Dead House), while the storylines were written by Hans Alfredson and Rickard Bergquist. The location shots were filmed at "Sturehov Slott", which is 19 km from Stockholm. Similar to the Australian series, Criminal Inspector Bert appears in the prerecorded footage to help provide further evidence. The audience tried to guess the correct solution and played for a trip for two to England.

Plot and gameplay 
A murder has been committed and during the course of the program it will be revealed who the murderer is at Döinge Hus. Countess von Thän, Miss Anette Gulling, Colonel Douglas Olsson, associate professor John Plommongren, pastor Seved Fillén and housekeeper Siv Holm are all suspects. Which murder weapon was used and in which room of the castle did the murder take place? Commissioner Bert Berg will try to solve the murder mystery. The suspects are also questioned by the audience. Who is really telling the truth and who has reason to lie?

Critical reception 
Daniel Hånberg Alonso of Filmkultur remembered the single series Swedish version as "very entertaining". Villanytt asked, "who doesn't remember" Cluedo. Citisenior deemed the series "successful". In 2015, TV4 advised they had no intention of re-running the series.

Episodes

Cast
 Grynet Molvig – Grevinnan Margareta von Thän (Mrs. Peacock)
 Gunvor Pontén – Hushållerskan Siv Holm (Mrs. White)
 Peder Falk – Overste Douglas Olsson (Colonel Mustard)
 Reuben Sallmander – Docent John Plommongren (Professor Plum)
 Mi Ridell – Fröken Anette Gulling (Miss Scarlett)
 Helge Skoog – Pastor Seved Fillén (Reverend Green)
 Rolf Skoglund – Kommissarie Bert Berg (Detective Sergeant Stanley Bogong)

Guest roles 
Kjell Bergqvist , Birgitta Andersson , Lakke Magnusson , Janne Carlsson , Jessica Zandén , Kim Anderzon , Peter Harrysson , Göran Gillinger , Eva Röse , Jakob Eklund and Allan Svensson .

References 

Cluedo
Swedish television shows